"Only Fools (Never Fall in Love)" is a song by British singer Sonia. It was produced by Nigel Wright for Sonia's second studio album, Sonia (1991). The song was written by Tony Hiller, who had success in the 1970s as manager for Brotherhood of Man, and one-time member Barry Upton. This song was released in May 1991 as the album's first single, and was a top ten hit in the United Kingdom and Ireland.

Background and writing
Co-writer Barry Upton commented that he'd initially written the song with Diana Ross in mind, but Sonia's A&R man, Simon Cowell heard the song and took it for her. After the single's success, Upton was keen to work with her directly, but Cowell prevented this.

Chart performance
In United Kingdom, "Only Fools (Never Fall in Love)" debuted at number 28 on 1 June 1991, climbed to number ten in its fourth week, and fell off the top 100 after eight weeks. It was much aired on the national radios, reaching number two on the airplay chart. It also reached a peak of number six in Ireland, number 29 in Finland and number 51 in Germany. On the Eurochart Hot 100, it started at number 64 on the chart edition of 15 June 1991, peaked at number 31 two weeks later and charted for a total of five weeks.

Critical reception
Mark Frith from Smash Hits described "Only Fools (Never Fall in Love)" as "a hand-clapping, trombone-touting song about love, boys and heartbreak that should have been made in 1963. Sonia would be The Supremes if she could find two other people like her".

Track listings
 7-inch and cassette single
 "Only Fools (Never Fall in Love)"
 "Only Fools (Never Fall in Love)" (instrumental)

 12-inch single
A. "Only Fools (Never Fall in Love)" (extended club mix)
B. "Only Fools (Never Fall in Love)" (instrumental)

 CD single
 "Only Fools (Never Fall in Love)" (7-inch version)
 "Only Fools (Never Fall in Love)" (extended club mix)
 "Only Fools (Never Fall in Love)" (instrumental)

Charts

References

1991 singles
1991 songs
Sonia (singer) songs
Songs written by Barry Upton
Songs written by Tony Hiller